Merulempista saharae is a species of snout moth in the genus Merulempista. It was described by Patrice J.A. Leraut in 2002 and is known from Morocco (including Maader Telmaout, the type location).

References

Moths described in 2002
Phycitini
Endemic fauna of Morocco
Moths of Africa